Judge John Hodgman is a weekly, comedic court show podcast hosted by John Hodgman and Jesse Thorn. The show is distributed online by Maximum Fun.

The program features host John Hodgman acting as a judge (with Jesse Thorn as bailiff) adjudicating real-life disputes within a fictional courtroom setting. The cases answer low-stakes questions like, "Should the kitchen sink's built-in dispenser be filled with dish soap or hand soap?" and "Can you stop family members from using your childhood nickname?"

History 

Judge John Hodgman was originally a segment of the Maximum Fun podcast Jordan, Jesse Go! When Hodgman ended his podcast Today In The Past, he began Judge John Hodgman as a full-fledged podcast. The podcast launched in November 2010, and released its 500th episode in January 2021.

Format 

In each episode, "Judge" John Hodgman hears and renders a judgment on a dispute (often over petty or trivial matters) between two people (calling in via Skype or similar program from their home location) in a virtual "courtroom" setting. Hodgman's co-host most episodes is "bailiff" Jesse Thorn, who introduces each episode, interjects humorous questions and observations during cases, and interviews the disputants before and after Hodgman's verdict is announced. Several episodes have also included notable "expert witnesses" who call in and offer their insight into the case. Though Hodgman has no formal legal training or experience (often describing himself as dispensing "fake internet justice"), and much of the content is played for laughs and entertainment, the disputants in each episode do verbally agree to abide by Hodgman's ruling before their case is heard.

The NPR show All Things Considered reported, "The show is a vehicle for comedy, but Hodgman and Thorn both say the podcast has an earnest side, too. Jokes aside, they say, Hodgman really does take the job of fake internet judge seriously. 'The best Judge John Hodgman cases,' Thorn says, 'are always about the relationship between the litigants.'"

There are also separate episodes in which Hodgman and Thorn "clear the docket", discussing and ruling on cases which were not selected for a full hearing.

Guests 

When Jesse Thorn is not available, his role has been filled by "Guest Bailiffs", including Scott Adsit, Elna Baker, Monte Belmonte, Elizabeth Gilbert, Jean Grae, Jordan Morris, Tom Scharpling, and Jake Tapper.
"Expert witnesses" calling in to offer their insights into cases have included Kurt Braunohler, Alton Brown, Brother Ali, Jonathan Coulton, Dante, John Darnielle, Jane Espenson, Jonathan Goldstein, Jonathan Miles, Eugene Mirman, David Rees, Mary Roach, John Roderick, Paul F. Tompkins, Morgan Webb, and Jon Wurster.

When Judge John Hodgman has been taken on the road and performed in front of a live audience, one or more musical guests have been invited to perform after or in between cases. These performers include John Darnielle, Jonathan Coulton, Jean Grae, Mr. Len, John Vanderslice, and MeLa Machinko.

On occasions that Hodgman was not available to record an episode, Jesse Thorn has acted as judge, with Jordan Morris of Jordan, Jesse, Go! filling in as bailiff.

Episodes 

In January 2021, the podcast released its 500th episode.

Special episodes

Judge John Hodgman: Maritime Edition 
In January 2011, two cases involving participants on the Jonathan Coulton Cruise Crazy were adjudicated by Judge John Hodgman and posted on YouTube.

Bonus episodes

Newspaper column 
Since October 2015, Judge John Hodgman has appeared as a newspaper column in The New York Times Magazine every Sunday, in which Hodgman settles disputes in a similar fashion.  Topics range from appropriate household toilet paper quotas to the proper way to wear a wedding band.

Live Show 
Judge John Hodgman has held live recordings on numerous occasions in the US and UK. In the U.S. the show has been held in venues ranging from 1000-1400 seats, including Boston's Wilbur Theatre, San Francisco's Castro Theatre, Seattle's Neptune Theatre and Brooklyn's Murmrr Theatre. In September 2017 two shows were held live at the London Podcast Festival at Kings Place, London, England.

Reception 
Judge John Hodgman has received critical praise in the media, from outlets including Rolling Stone, NPR's All Things Considered, HuffPost, Vox, Splendry, BoingBoing and Boston Magazine.

In November 2010, Boing Boings Mark Frauenfelder wrote "Only three episodes of the Judge John Hodgman podcast have been produced, but I know that it's going to be one of my favorites." Boston's Thomas Lewis called Judge John Hodgman a "hilarious podcast". A 2017 review on Splendry wrote, "Yes, these are silly disputes. And while there is much laughter, there is also much wisdom. I have found myself laughing uproariously and nodding thoughtfully in the same episode."

In 2013, Arizona muralist Joe Pagac created art for Judge John Hodgman entitled "Sexy Justice". "Sexy Justice" has since been made available via online retailer TopatoCo as prints.

In 2014, Rolling Stone ranked Judge John Hodgman #15 in their list "The 20 Best Comedy Podcasts Right Now".

Judge John Hodgman won the 2020 Webby Award for Comedy in the category Podcasts.

References

External links 

 

Audio podcasts
Comedy and humor podcasts
2010 podcast debuts
Maximum Fun
The New York Times Magazine
Works originally published in The New York Times Magazine